The Minister of Research, Science and Innovation is a ministerial portfolio in the government of New Zealand. The minister's responsibilities include leading the science and innovation system and setting the direction for government investment. 

The minister has oversight of the Crown Research Institutes, Callaghan Innovation, the Health Research Council of New Zealand, the Marsden Fund Council and the Royal Society of New Zealand. The portfolio is serviced by the Ministry of Business, Innovation and Employment.

The current minister is Ayesha Verrall.

History 
The portfolio was established in 1926, partway through the final term of the Reform government, as Minister in Charge of the Department of Scientific and Industrial Research. The first minister was the prime minister, Gordon Coates. The establishment of the portfolio accompanied the creation of the eponymous department. 

The portfolio title has changed several times since its establishment. In 1963, the portfolio was renamed Minister of Science. A subsequent name change to Minister of Science and Technology occurred in 1975. The title Minister of Research, Science and Technology was used from 1989 to 2011, when the portfolio became Minister of Science and Innovation to align with the short-lived Ministry of Science and Innovation.

The present title commenced from 2017.

List of ministers 
The following ministers have held the office of Minister of Research, Science and Innovation.

Key

Notes

References  

Lists of government ministers of New Zealand
People associated with Department of Scientific and Industrial Research (New Zealand)